Chintalapalli is a village in the East Godavari district of Andhra Pradesh, India. It is located in the Konaseema.

References

 Villages in East Godavari district